Brigadier Stephen John Tetlow  (born June 1954) is a chartered engineer and former senior British Army officer.

Biography 
Tetlow was born in Basford, Nottingham, and was educated at Burton Joyce Primary School, where he wanted to become a train driver and Carlton le Willows Grammar School. He read Mechanical Engineering at City, University of London, and gained an MSc in Design of Information Systems from Cranfield University and an MBA from The Open University.  He was appointed an Honorary Doctor of Engineering at University of Plymouth in 2019 for his work to inspire young people into engineering.

Tetlow had been promoted to Major by 1991, when he had received his MBE. He was then promoted to Colonel by 2011, when he qualified claims put forward by author Tim Blackmore that emerging technology would revolutionize battlespace in the near future - commenting that "conflict is, and will remain, essentially a human activity". Later promoted to Brigadier, he was gazetted to Director of the Royal Electrical and Mechanical Engineers. He was Director of Operations at the Defence Logistics Organisation from 2001 to 2002 and Director of Electrical and Mechanical Engineering of the British Army from 2002 to 2005.

After military service, Tetlow became Chief Executive of VOSA (formerly the Vehicle Inspectorate) in December 2004 following the retirement of Maurice Newey. Newey had been appointed chief executive of the Vehicle Inspectorate in 1998 and became the first chief executive of VOSA in 2003.  At VOSA, Tetlow led the computerisation of the MoT System which was awarded the British Computer Society Industry Award for Business to Business in 2007.  He was a Group Director of the Driver and Vehicle Operator Group of agencies of the Department for Transport and an advisor to the Department for Transport on Road User Charging.

Tetlow left VOSA in 2008 to become the Chief Executive of the Institution of Mechanical Engineers. He resigned from the IMechE after some members tabled a motion expressing a motion of no confidence in him and the trustees to manage the affairs of the Institution and the operation of its trading subsidiaries. The motion was defeated, but Tetlow, the President and some of the trustees resigned stating it was impractical for him to continue whilst some members did not agree his views for the future of the profession which he shared with other Institutions. He was a founder Non Executive Director of the National Skills Academy for Rail and Non Executive Director of Engineering UK.  He currently lives in the Blackdown Hills, Devon in a house featured on Grand Designs. He has since led an expedition to South Georgia in order to retrace the steps of Ernest Shackleton to highlight the impact of global warming.

Tetlow is currently a Non Executive Director of The Student Loans Company and of The Planning Inspectorate.  He is a fellow of The Institution of Engineering and Technology.

References

Bibliography

 

1954 births
Living people
Fellows of the Institution of Mechanical Engineers
Members of the Order of the British Empire
People educated at Carlton le Willows Academy
People from Basford, Nottinghamshire
Royal Electrical and Mechanical Engineers officers